Strange People is a 1933 American mystery film directed by Richard Thorpe and starring John Darrow, Gloria Shea and Hale Hamilton.

Cast
 John Darrow as Jimmy Allen - the Auto Salesman  
 Gloria Shea as Helen Mason - the Secretary  
 Hale Hamilton as J.E.Burton - the Attorney  
 Wilfred Lucas as John Davis  
 J. Frank Glendon as Robert Crandall - the Butler  
 Michael Visaroff as Edwards - the Caretaker  
 Jack Pennick as The Plumber  
 Jerry Mandy as Tony Scabolotto - the Barber  
 Lew Kelly as Smith - the Insurance Agent  
 Jane Keckley as Mrs. Reed - the Seamstress  
 Mary Foy as Mrs. Jones - the Housekeeper 
 Frank LaRue as Kelly  
 Stanley Blystone as Al Burke  
 Walter Brennan as The Radio Repairman

References

Bibliography
 Michael R. Pitts. Poverty Row Studios, 1929–1940: An Illustrated History of 55 Independent Film Companies, with a Filmography for Each. McFarland & Company, 2005.

External links
 

1933 films
1933 mystery films
American mystery films
Films directed by Richard Thorpe
Chesterfield Pictures films
American black-and-white films
1930s English-language films
1930s American films